The 1939–40 season was the 41st season for FC Barcelona.

Results

External links

webdelcule.com
webdelcule.com

References

FC Barcelona seasons
Barcelona